Bevis Wood (17 August 1929 – 29 January 2006) was a British racing cyclist. He rode in the 1955 Tour de France.

References

1929 births
2006 deaths
British male cyclists
Place of birth missing